Yahalom may refer to:

 Joseph Yahalom (born 1941), an Israeli professor of Hebrew literature
 Shaul Yahalom (born 1947), Israeli politician

Yaglom 
Yaglom, Jaglom are Russianized Hebrew form:
 Isaak Moiseevich Yaglom (1921, Kharkiv - 1988), a Jewish Ukrainian/Soviet mathematician and author of popular mathematics books
 Akiva Moiseevich Yaglom (1921, Kharkiv - 2007), a Jewish Ukrainian-Russian physicist, mathematician, statistician, and meteorologist
 Henry Jaglom, film director

References 

Hebrew-language surnames
Jewish surnames
Surnames of Ukrainian origin

ru:Яхалом (значения)